Népouite is a rare nickel silicate mineral which has the apple green colour typical of such compounds. It was named by the French mining engineer Edouard Glasser in 1907 after the place where it was first described (the type locality), the Népoui Mine, Poya Commune, North Province, New Caledonia. There is a similar mineral called lizardite (named after the Lizard Complex in Cornwall, England) in which all of the nickel is replaced by magnesium, formula . These two minerals form a series; intermediate compositions are possible, with varying proportions of nickel to magnesium.

Pecoraite is another rare mineral with the same chemical formula as népouite, but a different structure; such minerals are said to be dimorphs of each other, in the same way as graphite is a dimorph of diamond. Népouite, lizardite and pecoraite are all members of the kaolinite-serpentine group.

Garnierite is a green nickel ore that formed as a result of weathering of ultramafic rocks, and that occurs in many nickel deposits worldwide.  It is a mixture of various nickel and magnesium phyllosilicates (sheet silicates), including népouite.  Associated minerals include calcite, chlorite, goethite, halloysite, nontronite, pimelite, quartz, sepiolite, serpentine, talc and willemseite.

As well as the type locality in New Caledonia, it has been found in Australia, Austria, the Czech Republic, the Democratic Republic of Congo, Germany, Greece, Italy, Japan, Morocco, Poland, Russia, South Africa and the United States.

Structure
Space Group Ccm21. Unit Cell: a = 5.31 Å, b = 9.19 Å, c = 14.50 Å

See also 
 
 

References 

Serpentine group
Nickel minerals
Orthorhombic minerals
Minerals in space group 36